Brumback's night monkey (Aotus brumbacki) is a species of night monkey found in Colombia. It has traditionally been considered a subspecies of gray-bellied night monkey, Aotus lemurinus. but it has recently been argued that it should be considered a separate species.

References

Brumback's night monkey
Mammals of Colombia
Endemic fauna of Colombia
Brumback's night monkey
Taxa named by Philip Hershkovitz